Kumler is a ghost town in West Township, McLean County, Illinois, United States.

References

External links
Picture of Kumler (Daniel S. Dawdy)

Geography of McLean County, Illinois
Ghost towns in Illinois